The 1936–37 Ljubljana Subassociation League was the 18th season of the Ljubljana Subassociation League. Železničar Maribor won the league for the first time.

Ljubljana subdivision

Maribor subdivision

Final

References

External links
Football Association of Slovenia 

Slovenian Republic Football League seasons
Yugo
2
Football
Football